Velyka Krucha is a village in Lubny Raion, Poltava Oblast, Ukraine. It was home to a military air base.

References 

Villages in Lubny Raion